David Grant (1823-1886), was a Scottish poet.

Grant was born in 1823 in the parish of Upper Banchory, Kincardineshire, and was educated at Aberdeen University. He became a teacher in 1852, and for some time kept a school at Elgin, Moray. In 1861 he was appointed French master in Oundle grammar school, Northamptonshire. In 1865 he became assistant master of Eccleshall College, a private school near Sheffield. Subsequently he purchased a day school in Sheffield, which proved a failure, and in 1880 he had to retire from his charge penniless. From that date till his death in 1886 he acted as a private tutor in Edinburgh. He published 'Metrical Tales' at Sheffield in 1880, and 'Lays and Legends of the North' at Edinburgh in 1884. 'A Book of Ten Songs,' with music, with a preface by Professor Blackie, appeared after his death. His poems evince a sense of humour, and he had considerable narrative power in verse.

References

1823 births
1886 deaths
19th-century Scottish people
19th-century poets
Scottish poets
People from Banchory
Alumni of the University of Aberdeen
Scottish educators
19th-century British educators
19th-century Scottish writers